The CORE Club (styled Core:) is a private members' club in New York City. It was founded in 2005 by Jennie Enterprise with funding from the property developer Aby Rosen. From 2005 to 2022 the CORE Club was based at 66 East 55th Street in Manhattan before moving to 711 Fifth Avenue in September 2022.

The members of CORE Club are drawn from the financial and social elite of New York. The initiation fee for the club is $50,000 with subsequent annual dues of $17,000.

History
The CORE Club was founded in 2005 by Jennie Enterprise (née Saunders) at 66 East 55th Street in Manhattan, in New York City. Enterprise had been part of a team designing Reebok Sports Clubs before she founded the CORE Group. Enterprise intended the CORE Group to be a global group of private members' clubs. Enterprise sought to establish her clubs without success for two years before she met the property developer Aby Rosen through a mutual friend. Rosen offered Enterprise a "couple million" in seed money and space in a new building on East 55th Street. With Rosen's support and his contacts Enterprise was able to recruit members and raise an additional $10 million. Enterprise then recruited researchers to find potential members before sending them a "marketing kit" with a book called "Good Life: A Prehistory of the Core Club" described by Warren St. James in the New York Times as being "filled with black and white photos of flappers, old America's Cup yachting photos and other images of the Jazz Age: a branding gimmick more fitting of a clothing company, perhaps, than a private club".

The interior of the club was designed by Stonely Pelsinski Architects Neukomm (SPAN).

The club reopened in a new location at 711 Fifth Avenue in September 2022. The club occupies 60,000 square feet of the top four floors of 711 Fifth Avenue. The club has a library, theater, and dining rooms, and private meeting rooms and 11 suites for overnight guests. Amenities at the club include a gym and spa, beauty salon and health bar. The Dangene Institute at the CORE Club offers a service that offers "skinovation" with "noninvasive, nonsurgical kinds of age-optimization, longevity, and just [eliminating] imperfections, generally". The Dangene Institute was established by Dangene Enterprise (née McKay-Bailey), Jennie's wife. The couple changed their last names to 'Enterprise' upon marriage.

Jennie Enterprise said in 2011 that "You're not going to find an unhappy person in the Core club ... If someone on the staff is having a bad day, an off day, we tell them to stay home" and that "We don't have negative energy entering the Core club universe. And there is an acute awareness of the need to execute the right judgment at all times". Enterprise said in 2005 that the club was "so much more" than a "reimagined private club concept" as her " ... vision and our goal as an organization is to provide the conditions for transformation" with a " ... hyper-edited collection of people, art, books and ideas - a compelling collage".

A branch of CORE is scheduled to open in December 2022 on the Corso Giacomo Matteotti in Milan, Italy in a 40,000 square foot palazzo. A branch in San Francisco is due to open in 2023 in the Transamerica Pyramid.

Writing for Bloomberg News, James Tarmy described the CORE Club as a "safe berth" for its members on "their endless march" between American Express Centurion Lounges and conference rooms.

Membership
The membership of the CORE Club is drawn from the economic and social elite of New York City. Writing in the New York Times in 2005 Warren St. James described the club as being a place for "a geographically and socially diverse set of wealthy people to gather and meet others of the same disparate tribe" and an "ambitious act of social exclusion". Guy Trebay, writing in The New York Times in 2011 felt that the club's members had an "almost cartoonish relationship to conspicuous consumption and the unwavering conviction that Thorstein Veblen had it all wrong". Jennie Enterprise has said that her membership criteria is " ... if somebody has an interesting story to tell, they'd be a great member."

The CORE Club had 1,500 members in early 2022. Only 30% are residents of New York City. The initiation fee for the club was $50,000 in 2018 with a $17,000 annual fee. The 100 founder members were asked to contribute $100,000 and nominate another person. The founder members included J. Christopher Burch, Millard S. Drexler, Ari Emanuel, Patricia Kluge, Aby Rosen, Steven Roth and Stephen A. Schwarzman and Terry Semel. The club has an equal number of female and male members.

The founder members were repaid their investment with interest over the next five years. An additional 200 members joined the club in 2005 with the payment of $55,000 entrance fees.

Notable members of CORE have included financier Steven A. Cohen, the designer Kenneth Cole, philanthropist Beth Rudin DeWoody, the Commissioner of the National Football League Roger Goodell, businessman James F. McCann, Microsoft executive Nathan Myhrvold, financier Anthony Scaramucci and the Starbucks chairman and CEO Howard Schultz. In 2005 members included gallery owner Marianne Boesky, lawyer and civil rights activist Vernon Jordan, American footballer Dan Marino, tennis player John McEnroe, architect Richard Meier, and musicians Patty Smyth and Roger Waters. Sean Combs launched his cologne at the club with Jay-Z and Nelly. Prince Edward, Earl of Wessex attended a dinner at the club in September 2018.

In a 2011 article on the club for The New York Times, Guy Trebay described the members of the club as "ostensibly younger and possibly hipper but certainly richer and more unashamedly over-the-top than the literati and assorted members of the intelligentsia" that comprise traditional members clubs such as the Century Association, Colony Club, Union Club or Metropolitan clubs. Trebay felt the decor of the club "revels in the shiny aura of the newly arrived" as opposed to the "well-waxed and cigar-scented havens burnished by custom and softened by wear" with "... overstuffed armchairs squared off at the perimeter of Oriental rugs, private humidors and afternoon teas" of the traditional member's clubs of New York's social elite. The art in the CORE Club is loaned by its members. In 2011 the club displayed pieces by Alexander Calder, Richard Prince, David Salle and Andy Warhol.

References

External links
 
SPAN NY: The interior of CORE Club
CORE: Culture - A list of cultural events hosted by CORE

2005 establishments in New York (state)
Clubs and societies in New York City
Fifth Avenue
Organizations established in 2005
Upper East Side
Private members' clubs